Boualem is a town and commune in El Bayadh Province, Algeria. It is the district seat of Boualem District.

References

Communes of El Bayadh Province